Saint-Pierre-de-Lamps is a former commune in the Indre department in central France. On 1 January 2019, it was merged into the commune Levroux, and became a delegated commune.

Population

See also
Communes of the Indre department

References

Former communes of Indre